Boniface Joseph Luykx (6 February 1915 – 11 April 2004) was a Norbertine priest in Belgium, a Roman Catholic liturgical expert, and a founder/Hegumen of a Ukrainian Greek Catholic monastery in Northern California. A polyglot, he had a photographic memory and was instrumental in the motivation and preparation for Vatican II.

Books
 Culte chrétien en Afrique après Vatican II
 "Failure of the Liturgical Reform. 'It wasn't supposed to be like this!" (3 audio cassettes)
 Eastern Monasticism and the Future of the Church, Basileos Press, CT

Biographical books
 Luykx, Boniface; Chirovsky, Andriy (2002) Following the Star from the East: Essays in Honour of Archimandrite Boniface Luykx. Metropolitan Andrey Sheptytsky Institute of Eastern Christian Studies, Saint Paul University, Ottawa, ON, Canada.

External links
Eulogy for Archimandrite Boniface

Liturgists
Second Vatican Council
Luykx
1915 births
2004 deaths
Belgian priests